Mehrchin (also Romanized as Mehrchīn)

 is a village in Malard Rural District, in the Central District of Malard County, Tehran Province, Iran. At the 2006 census, its population was 842, in 240 families.

References 

Populated places in Malard County